Brno main railway station (abbreviated as Brno hl. n.) is the principal railway station in Brno, the largest city in Moravia and the second largest in the Czech Republic. The railway station is situated in the city centre on the site of the former city walls. It is one of the oldest railway stations in the Czech Republic, having been in operation since 1839.

History

First railway station
Brno main railway station was built in 1838, one of the first railway stations in the world. It was the terminus on the line from Vienna to Brno, one of the branches of Emperor Ferdinand Northern Railway. On 16 November 1838 it was put into operation for trials and exhibitions, and on 7 July 1839 it became fully commercially operational. It was initially designed as a terminal station by Austrian architect Anton Jüngling.

Second railway station

The railway station became a through station after construction of the rival Northern Railway (Imperial Royal Austrian State Railways) in 1849. As soon as the traffic at the railway station, which was occupied by two competing companies, started to grow, some space limitation caused by bevelled shape between two segments of a polygonal principle Brno Ringstrasse.

Third railway station

At the turn of the 19th to 20th centuries the side wings of individual companies were connected with a single Concourse (entrance hall), which served to both of them. The author of this partially Art Nouveau building was architect Josef Oehm. The hall has an outline of 18x25 metres. The oldest transverse subway leads in its axis under the platform 4. The hall construction was finished in 1904. Railway station was partially and surfacing (visual only) modernized in 1947 by architect Bohuslav Fuchs, the last time in 1988.

Platforms

Brno main railway station has 4 through platforms with 6 lines and 2 terminal platforms, to make a total of 6 platforms. The through platforms are 415 and 310 metres long and built in an S-shape. The terminal platforms are straight and 350 metres long. The platforms are at least 9 metres wide.

Routes

Brno main station is an important station on the pan-international corridor passing through the country (Děčín – Prague – Pardubice – Brno – Břeclav), with international trains serving the station to and from Germany, Slovakia, Hungary and Austria. It is also located on five other lines, three of which carry intercity trains:

Brno - Jihlava – České Budějovice – Plzeň
Brno - Havlíčkův Brod – Prague
Brno - Přerov – Olomouc/Ostrava
Brno - Uherské Hradiště
Brno - Hrušovany nad Jevišovkou

Future plans
Currently Brno station is approaching at full capacity and therefore in need of expansion, however its location on the edge of the historic center of the city prevents that. Capacity problems are just in one part of the railway station, on the southern station head (switch system), where is a regional transport. The question of how to cope with the substance of railway station has been being discussed for several decades. The idea of moving railway station to the new location, 550 metres southern, emerged already in the 1920s. It was after a sudden increase of transport capacity between 1923 and 1924 (26% more). Such an increase has never happened again. Experts who worked for Brno before World War II abandoned this idea. Later on this idea reappeared several times in the new contexts. In 1970 railway station was relieved from freight transport which was transferred to the modernized track on the South. Since then the railway station has been intended purely for passenger transportation.

The city council have made plans to build a new station in a remote location – 960 metres southeast from the city where personal and cargo transport would be reunited again. This possibility is confronted with a continuous opposition of experts and public. Already in 2004 this situation invoked a citizens-initiated referendum. However, this referendum did not become binding for city because of the insufficient turnout (25%). Legislation required 50% turnout at that time. The overwhelming majority of 85% of voters was for keeping railway station on the current place. Nowadays citizens have initiated a new referendum, which will be held simultaneously with regional and senate election  on the 7 and 8 October 2016. According to the current legislation only 35% turnout is sufficient for legally binding outcome of the referendum.

Services

References

Notes

Further reading

Books
 ARTL, Gerhard/ GURLICH, Gerhard H. / ZENZ, Hubert (Hrsg.2010), Allerhöchste Eisenbahn. 170 Jahre Nordbahn Wien-Brünn, 2. erw. Aufl., Wien (German)
 HORN, Alfred (1970), Die Kaiser-Ferdinands-Nordbahn. Die Bahnen Österreich-Ungarns, Band 2. Bohmann-Verlag, Wien (German)
 KREJČIŘÍK, Mojmír (2003 and 2005), Česká nádraží I.a II díl. Litoměřice (Vydavatelství dopravní literatury Ing. Luděk Čada).  (Czech)

Article
 Czech Radio:Authorities okay moving Brno's main train station out of city centre
 Moravian Integrated Public Transport System

External links

 Brno hlavní nádraží, official website
 Train station Brno hl.n.: Brno Central railway station
 Brno Central station, Time table schedule - on line
 Brno hlavní nádraží, timetable - Czech
 Train network map in The Czech Republic
 

Art Nouveau architecture in the Czech Republic
Art Nouveau railway stations
Hlavní nádraží
Railway stations in South Moravian Region
Anton Jüngling railway stations
Transport infrastructure completed in 1904
Railway stations in the Czech Republic opened in 1839